Kaniz may refer to:

Places
 Tappeh Kaniz, a village in Qorqori District, Hirmand County, Sistan and Baluchestan Province, Iran

People
 Kaniz Ali (born 1985), a Bangladeshi-born British makeup artist and freelance beauty columnist
 Kaniz Fatema Roksana, first Bangladeshi woman commercial pilot